Maritrema is a genus of trematodes (flukes) in the family Microphallidae, although some have suggested its placement in the separate family Maritrematidae. It was first described by Nikoll in 1907 from birds in Britain. Species of the genus usually infect birds, but several have switched hosts and are found in mammals, such as the marsh rice rat. Several species use the fiddler crab Uca pugilator as an intermediate host.

Species include:
Maritrema acadiae (Swales, 1933)
Maritrema arenaria Hadley and Castle, 1940
Maritrema bonaerensis Etchegoin and Martorelli, 1997
Maritrema carpathica Matskasi, 1984
Maritrema chiriacae Deblock, 1975
Maritrema feliui Gracenea, Montoliu and Deblock, 1993
Maritrema gratiosum Nikoll, 1907
Maritrema heardi (Kinsella and Deblock, 1994)
Maritrema humile Nikoll, 1907
Maritrema lepidum Nikoll, 1907
Maritrema majestova Ke, 1976
Maritrema neomi Tkoch, 1998
Maritrema oocysta Lebour, 1907
Maritrema paracadiae Ching, 1974
Maritrema prosthometra Deblock and Heard, 1969
Maritrema pulcherrima Travassos, 1928
Maritrema pyrenaica Deblock and Combes, 1965
Maritrema subdolum Jägerskiöld, 1909
Maritrema Poulini 
Maritrema novaezealandense 
An undescribed species, "Maritrema sp. I", is known from clapper rails (Rallus crepitans) and marsh rice rats (Oryzomys palustris) in the eastern United States. M. heardi was placed in a separate genus Floridatrema upon its description in 1994 on the basis of a morphological difference, but was reassigned to Maritrema in 2005, as molecular data indicated that Maritrema would be paraphyletic without the inclusion of the species.

References

Literature cited

 

Plagiorchiida genera